KAGZ may refer to:

 Wagner Municipal Airport (ICAO code KAGZ)
 KGFZ, a radio station (97.7 FM) licensed to serve Burke, Texas, United States, which held the call sign KAGZ from 2009 to 2022